The Moor is the fourth book in Mary Russell series by Laurie R. King.

Mary Russell and Sherlock Holmes investigate strange goings-on on Dartmoor. Reprising the setting and some of the plotlines of The Hound of the Baskervilles, Holmes and Russell come to the aid of the Reverend Sabine Baring-Gould.

For an excerpt of the first chapter, go to Laurie R. King's website.

Timeline
The events in the book take place between September and November 1923.

Plot
The book opens with Mary Russell receiving a telegram to come immediately to Devon and to bring her compass. Initially Mary is reluctant to abandon her academic studies in Oxford to assist Sherlock, but she finally complies. This tug and pull of the two individuals in their own professional lives erupts throughout the book to show each person's independence, yet reliance on each other. 

Sherlock has been called in to solve a murder on Dartmoor. For Sherlock, it's familiar territory; it's where he solved the case of The Hound of the Baskervilles. This time round there are tales of a ghostly hound out on the moors accompanying an equally ghostly carriage. And naturally, the story is populated with sinister local characters. 

The moor is central to the story, brooding over it as the moor broods over the surrounding landscape. It also has Rev. Sabine Baring-Gould as a central character. He has a strong intellectual curiosity and is the driving force behind the investigation.

Laurie King uses many of the elements of The Hound of the Baskervilles. These elements are introduced deliberately on the part of the criminals and there are echoes of the original story. The way that Holmes reacts to the many mentions of the original case, with a mixture of pride and exasperation, allows for some very humorous moments.

References

External links 
 

1998 American novels
Mary Russell (book series)
Sherlock Holmes pastiches
Novels set in Devon
Fiction set in 1923